Pacific Garden Mission is a homeless shelter in the Near West Side section of Chicago, Illinois, founded in 1877 by Colonel George Clarke and his wife, Sarah. Nicknamed "The Old Lighthouse", it is the largest homeless shelter in Chicago and among the oldest in the city, and, according to the PGM website, "is the oldest continuously operating rescue mission in the country."

Among the converts to Christ from PGM's efforts are the famous evangelists Billy Sunday and Mel Trotter.

In 1950, the Mission began production of Unshackled!, a radio dramatic series showcasing conversions to Evangelical Christianity. The show, recorded live at PGM, remains in production today and is translated into seven languages for international distribution.

PGM's original location was at 386 S. Clark Street. In 1880, the mission moved to 67 E. Van Buren Street, in a location formerly known as the Pacific Beer Garden. The current name, Pacific Garden Mission, was adopted at that time; it was suggested by evangelist D.L. Moody that the name of the former occupant be kept but with the word "Beer" dropped from the name.

In 1923 the Mission moved to 646 S. State Street, just south of The Loop, following a shift in the location of Chicago's Skid Row. At that time, the area was known for its hobo jungles and flophouses.

Due to large population growth in the neighborhood beginning in the 1990s and continuing through the 2000s, the City of Chicago filed suit against the Mission in the early 2000s in order to expand the undersized and outdated facilities of Jones College Prep, a public high school located at 606 S. State Street, next door to Pacific Garden. The Mission signed an agreement with the city in December 2004 to move to a new location at 1458 South Canal Street, about one mile southwest of its State Street location. PGM's State Street building was slated for demolition to make room for the Jones expansion. Groundbreaking for the new PGM facility took place on November 16, 2005. The building, designed by Chicago architect Stanley Tigerman of Tigerman McCurry Architects, was completed in 2007, with the formal dedication October 13, 2007.

Notes

External links
Pacific Garden Mission official website
Articles mentioning PGM from the Chicago Tribune

Evangelical Christian missions
Homeless shelters in the United States
1877 establishments in Illinois
Buildings and structures in Chicago
Landmarks in Chicago